Teja Gregorin (born 29 June 1980 in Ljubljana, SFR Yugoslavia) is a retired Slovenian biathlete.

Career
She was a member of the Slovenian biathlon team from 2002 to 2017, having been a cross-country skier before that. Her best result in the Biathlon World Cup is 2nd place in the 15 km Individual race in the World Championships held in Pyeongchang, Korea during the 2008–09 season. At the 2012 World Championships, Gregorin won the silver medal at the mixed relay, together with Andreja Mali, Klemen Bauer and Jakov Fak.

The Slovenian biathlete was the only competitor who failed the 2017 doping retests from the 2010 Winter Olympics. In October 2017, the International Biathlon Union said that two samples given by Teja Gregorin tested positive for GHRP-2, a banned substance which stimulates the body to produce more growth hormone, in samples taken the week before competition started. She was disqualified in December 2017.

Biathlon results

Olympic Games

World Championships

World Cup

Podiums

*Results are from IBU races which include the Biathlon World Cup, Biathlon World Championships and the Winter Olympic Games.

Cross-country skiing results
All results are sourced from the International Ski Federation (FIS).

Olympic Games

World Championships

a.  Cancelled due to extremely cold weather.

World Cup

Season standings

References

1980 births
Living people
Slovenian female biathletes
Slovenian female cross-country skiers
Cross-country skiers at the 2002 Winter Olympics
Biathletes at the 2006 Winter Olympics
Biathletes at the 2010 Winter Olympics
Biathletes at the 2014 Winter Olympics
Olympic biathletes of Slovenia
Olympic cross-country skiers of Slovenia
Sportspeople from Ljubljana
Biathlon World Championships medalists
Medalists at the 2014 Winter Olympics
Olympic bronze medalists for Slovenia
Olympic medalists in biathlon
Doping cases in biathlon
Slovenian sportspeople in doping cases